California Message is an album by saxophonist/composer Benny Golson that was recorded in 1980 and released on the Japanese Baystate label the following year. The album features trombonist Curtis Fuller, Golsons colleague from The Jazztet who also played with The Jazz Messengers, and was reissued on the Dutch Timeless label in 1984.

Reception

The AllMusic review by Steve Loewy said "While not one of Benny Golson's best recordings, there are still delights to be found. Golson leads a septet of trombonist Curtis Fuller plus mostly studio musicians from the Los Angeles area, performing a set of generally well-known tunes written by the leader ... trumpeter Oscar Brashear is a pleasant surprise with his lyrical, forward-looking solos. Golson is a pleasure to hear, too, on both tenor and soprano saxophones. Largely, the recording is fairly ordinary, though, with a sense that much of this has been done before, only better, by groups led by Golson. There is better Golson available elsewhere".

Track listing 
All compositions by Benny Golson
 "California Message" – 5:41
 "Soul Talk" – 6:41
 "Blues March" – 5:56
 "The Berliner" – 5:48
 "Whisper Not" – 8:55
 "Free Again" – 7:15
 "I Remember Clifford" – 6:30

Personnel 
Benny Golson – tenor saxophone, soprano saxophone
Curtis Fuller – trombone
Oscar Brashear – trumpet
Thurman Green – trombone
Bill Mays – piano
Bob Magnusson - bass 
Roy McCurdy – drums

Production
Fumimaru Kawashima, Makoto Kimata – producer
Ron Nadel – engineer

References 

Benny Golson albums
1981 albums
Baystate Records albums
Timeless Records albums